The 2006 World Touring Car Championship season was the third season of FIA World Touring Car Championship motor racing. It featured a ten event, twenty race series which commenced on 2 April 2006 and ended on 19 November. The series was open to Super 2000, Diesel 2000 and Super Production Cars, with  two titles awarded, the FIA World Touring Car Champion for Drivers and the FIA World Touring  Car Champion for Manufacturers. Andy Priaulx won the Drivers title and BMW won the Manufacturers award.

Teams and drivers

The following drivers and teams contested the 2006 World Touring Car Championship.

Drivers changes
Changed Teams
 Gabriele Tarquini: Alfa Romeo Racing Team → SEAT Sport
 James Thompson: Alfa Romeo Racing Team → SEAT Sport

Entering WTCC including those who entered one-off rounds in 2005
 Yvan Muller: British Touring Car Championship → SEAT Sport
 Marcel Costa: No full-time drive → BMW Team Italy-Spain
 Gianni Morbidelli: FIA GT Championship → N-Technology
 Salvatore Tavano: Italian Superturismo Championship → N-Technology
 Maurizio Ceresoli: Italian Formula Three Championship → GR Asia
 Pierre-Yves Corthals: No full-time drive → Jas Motorsport
 Ryan Sharp: Formula Renault 3.5 Series → Jas Motorsport
 Luca Rangoni: No full-time drive → Proteam Motorsport
 Emmet O'Brien: European Alfa Romeo 147 Challenge → Wiechers-Sport
 Diego Romanini: FIA GT Championship → Wiechers-Sport

Leaving WTCC
 Fabrizio Giovanardi: Alfa Romeo Racing Team → British Touring Car Championship
 Antonio García: BMW Team Italy-Spain → No full-time drive
 Thomas Klenke: Ford Hotfiel Sport → No full-time drive
 Michael Funke: Ford Hotfiel Sport → ADAC GT Masters
 Roberto Colciago: Jas Motorsport → Italian Superturismo Championship
 Adriano de Micheli: Jas Motorsport → No full-time drive
 Giuseppe Cirò: Proteam Motorsport → Ferrari Challenge
 Marc Hennerici: Wiechers-Sport → Veranstaltergemeinschaft Langstreckenpokal Nürburgring

Calendar
Each event comprised  two races of 50 kilometres distance. The starting grid for the first race was determined by the results of the qualifying session and the grid for the second race by the provisional results of the first race, with the top eight positions reversed.

Results and standings

Races

Standings

Drivers' Championship
Championship points were awarded on a 10–8–6–5–4–3–2–1 basis for the first eight positions in each race.

† — Drivers did not finish the race, but were classified as they completed over 90% of the race distance.

Manufacturers' Championship
Championship points were awarded on a 10–8–6–5–4–3–2–1 basis for the first eight positions in each race. However, only the two best placed cars per manufacturer were eligible to score points and all other cars from that manufacturer were considered invisible as far as point scoring was concerned.

Yokohama Independents' Trophy
Points were awarded on a 10–8–6–5–4–3–2–1 basis for the first eight finishers of those entries which were classified as Independents.

 Dead-heat
 10p: 14th Edman (4th x 2), 15th A. Chi Hong (4th x 1)
 5p: 17th L. Molo (4th x 1), 18th O. Hidalgo (5th x 1)
 2p: 21st M. De Villota (7th x 1), 22nd P. Geipel (7th x 1), 23rd D. Roda (7th x 1), 24th S. Valli (8th x 2)

Yokohama Teams' Trophy
Points were awarded on a 10–8–6–5–4–3–2–1 basis for the first eight finishers of those entries which were classified as Independents.

Notes

References

External links
 FIA World Touring Car Championship official website as archived at web.archive.org on 23 December 2006